Ra Choi is a 2006 independent Australian feature film written and directed by Michael Frank for Makovision Films.

Awards
Won Best Feature at the 2005 Australian Writers Guild AWGIE awards.
Winner of Gold Remi at Worldfest Houston 2006.
Screened at Sydney Film Festival, London Australian Film Festival, Rome Independent Film Festival, Berlin Asia Pacific Film Festival, Cinemasia Amsterdam.

Cast
Paul He as Dac Kien
Nammi Le Benson as Trinh
Charles Nguyen as Lanh
Nina Karen Fernandez as Lucy

References

External links
 
 

2006 films
Australian independent films
2006 drama films
Australian drama films
2006 independent films
2000s English-language films
2000s Australian films